The 1989 Virginia Slims of Houston was a women's tennis tournament played on outdoor clay courts at the Westside Tennis Club in Houston, Texas in the United States that was part of the Category 4 tier of the 1989 WTA Tour. The tournament was held from April 24 through April 30, 1989. Unseeded Monica Seles won the singles title.

Finals

Singles

 Monica Seles defeated  Chris Evert 3–6, 6–1, 6–4
 It was Seles' only title of the year and the 1st of her career.

Doubles

 Katrina Adams /  Zina Garrison defeated  Gigi Fernández /  Lori McNeil 6–3, 6–4
 It was Adams' 3rd title of the year and the 7th of her career. It was Garrison's 2nd title of the year and the 19th of her career.

External links
 ITF tournament edition details
 Tournament draws

Virginia Slims of Houston
Virginia Slims of Houston
Virginia Slims of Houston
Virginia Slims of Houston
Virginia Slims of Houston
Virginia Slims of Houston